George Garfield Weston (born 4 March 1964) is a British businessman, and chief executive (CEO) of Associated British Foods.

Early life and family background
George G. Weston was born on 4 March 1964 in the United Kingdom. He is the son of Garry Weston and Mary Ruth Kippenberger.

Weston attended the Westminster School and then New College, Oxford. He holds an MA in PPE and an MBA from Harvard Business School.

Career
Weston was managing director of Westmill Foods (who make Allinson Flour) from 1992-8, then Allied Bakeries from 1999-2003. He was chief executive of George Weston Foods Ltd (Australia) from 2003-5. He became CEO of ABF plc in 2005.

Personal life
Weston married Katharine Acland, daughter of Sir Antony Acland, in January 1996 in Windsor and Maidenhead. They have three sons (born March 2001, April 2002 and July 2004) and one daughter (born September 1999).

References

External links
 Biography
 Appointed chief executive in September 2004

1964 births
Living people
George G. Weston
Alumni of New College, Oxford
Harvard Business School alumni
People educated at Westminster School, London
English chief executives
Associated British Foods people